Sotirios Trakas (born 13 January 1987) is a former Greek diver. He competed in the synchronised 10 metre platform, along with Ioannis Gavriilidis, and the 10 metre platform events at the 2004 Summer Olympics in his hometown of Athens.

References

External links

1987 births
Living people
Greek male divers
Divers at the 2004 Summer Olympics
Olympic divers of Greece
Sportspeople from Athens